Valea Stânii may refer to several villages in Romania:

 Valea Stânii, a village in Țițești Commune, Argeș County
 Valea Stânii, a village in Luica Commune, Călărași County